Thailand competed at the 1984 Summer Paralympics in Stoke Mandeville, Great Britain and New York City, United States. 4 competitors from Thailand won no medals and so did not place in the medal table.

See also 
 Thailand at the Paralympics
 Thailand at the 1984 Summer Olympics

References 

Thailand at the Paralympics
1984 in Thai sport
Nations at the 1984 Summer Paralympics